Naseh Talkhah-e Zarguruk may refer to:
 Naseh Talkhah-e Zarguruk-e Olya
 Naseh Talkhah-e Zarguruk-e Sofla